On December 16, 2000, a destructive tornado outbreak hit the Southeastern United States, from Mississippi to North Carolina. The most significant tornado of the outbreak occurred in communities south and east of Tuscaloosa, Alabama. The F4 tornado killed 11 people and injured more than 125 others; it was the strongest tornado to hit the state of Alabama in the month of December since 1950.

Confirmed tornadoes

December 16 event

Tuscaloosa, Alabama

The tornado touched down just before 12:54 p.m. A tornado emergency was issued for the area before it lifted near Cottondale east of Tuscaloosa near the concurrent Interstate 20/59. The worst damage was located near the Bear Creek and Hillcrest Meadows areas where F4 damage occurred, and homes were completely leveled. Near I-59/20, several commercial buildings including hotels and restaurants were heavily damaged and a shopping center near Highway 69 was also hit and partially destroyed. Damage was estimated at over $12 million. More than 40 houses and 70 mobile homes were completely destroyed, with hundreds more seriously damaged.

It was the deadliest tornado to hit the state since the Birmingham F5 tornado that killed 32 people across portions of northwestern Jefferson County on April 8, 1998. That tornado started just northeast of Tuscaloosa during the evening hours, demolishing numerous structures south and west of the Birmingham metro area. Since records have been kept in 1950, the Tuscaloosa tornado is the third deadliest tornado in December, tied with an F4 tornado near Murphysboro, Illinois on December 18, 1957, and behind the Vicksburg, Mississippi F5 tornado on December 5, 1953, which killed 38 people, and the 2021 Western Kentucky tornado, which killed 58 people.

The tornado was part of a supercell thunderstorm that developed across Mississippi before traveling across Alabama, dropping more tornadoes in St. Clair and Etowah counties. Additional tornadoes were confirmed northwest of Birmingham and Jasper.

Tower Cam footage
The tornado was also captured live on the ABC affiliate WBMA/WCFT/WJSU (channels 58, 33, and 40, generally called "ABC 33/40") in Birmingham during a special severe weather bulletin with meteorologists James Spann, Mark Prater, and John Oldshue. The tornado was caught by the station's tower cam located just outside downtown Tuscaloosa along Interstate 59/20 at Woodland Road on US 82. The National Academy of Television Arts and Sciences gave Spann an Emmy Award for the event. The tornado was followed from Englewood to just near its passage south of downtown Tuscaloosa when the reception was lost due to a torrential downpour.

See also
List of North American tornadoes and tornado outbreaks
2011 Super Outbreak
2011 Tuscaloosa–Birmingham tornado – An EF4 tornado that struck Tuscaloosa and Birmingham, resulting in 64 fatalities.
Tornado outbreak of April 14–16, 2011 – An EF3 tornado that took a very similar track to the 2000 tornado.

References

External links
Summary of December 16, 2000 tornado event including Tuscaloosa Tornado
Map of tornadoes on December 16, 2000
Storm Summary from NOAA
 Live footage of tornado from ABC 33/40
Still from the footage to use for picture here please

F4 tornadoes by date
Tuscaloosa,2000-12-16
Tornadoes of 2000
Tornadoes in Alabama
Tornadoes in Florida
Tornadoes in Georgia (U.S. state)
Tornadoes in Mississippi
2000 natural disasters in the United States
2000 in Alabama
Tuscaloosa tornado